Phelps Mountain is a mountain located in Essex County, New York. 
The mountain is named after Orson Schofield "Old Mountain" Phelps (1817–1905), who cut the first trail up Mount Marcy and named several of the Adirondack peaks.  It is the 32nd highest peak in New York.
Phelps Mountain is flanked to the southeast by Table Top Mountain.

Phelps Mountain stands within the watershed of the West Branch of the Ausable River, which drains into Lake Champlain, thence into Canada's Richelieu River, the Saint Lawrence River, and into the Gulf of Saint Lawrence.
The south side of Phelps Mtn. drains into Phelps Brook, thence into Marcy Brook, and the Ausable's West Branch.
The northwest side of Phelps Mtn. drains into Pelkey Brook, thence into Marcy Brook.
The northeast side of Phelps drains into Klondike Brook, thence into Marcy Brook.

Phelps is climbed regularly, and has a well marked trail. The trail is rocky and is very steep in some parts of the final approach to the summit. There are good views of Marcy, Colden, and Algonquin near the summit. There are also views of the ridge formed by Table Top, Yard, and Big Slide. There is a partial view of The Great Range, and Giant can be seen in the distance. 
 
Phelps Mountain is within the High Peaks Wilderness Area of the Adirondack State Park.

See also 
 List of mountains in New York
 Northeast 111 4,000-footers
 Adirondack High Peaks
 Adirondack Forty-Sixers

Notes

External links 
  Peakbagger.com: Phelps Mountain
  Summitpost.org: Phelps Mountain
 

Mountains of Essex County, New York
Adirondack High Peaks
Mountains of New York (state)